Eoin McCarthy (born 1963, Dún Laoghaire, County Dublin, Ireland) is an Irish actor.

He appeared in films such as Alien vs. Predator and television programmes such as Cadfael , Lovejoy and Roman Mysteries.

He also starred in the Dutch TV-film Kilkenny Cross.

Filmography

External links

Living people
1963 births
Irish male television actors
Irish male film actors